Sigmundsson may refer to:

Beinir Sigmundsson (10th century – c. 970), chieftain in the Faroe Islands
Brestir Sigmundsson (10th century -ca. 970), chieftain in the Faroe Islands
Freyr Gauti Sigmundsson (born 1972), Icelandic judoka
Ivar Sigmundsson (born 1942), Icelandic alpine skier
Kristinn Sigmundsson (born 1951), Icelandic operatic bass

See also
Siegmundsburg
Sigmundstor